Roofstock is an Oakland-based financial technology startup founded by Gary Beasley, Rich Ford, and Gregor Watson in May 2015.

Acquisitions 

 In July 2018, Roofstock acquired Streetlane, a Dallas-based single-family rental management company.
 In March 2021, Roofstock acquired Stessa, the leading asset management software-as-a-service solution for SFR investors.
 In August 2021, Roofstock acquired Great Jones property management platform.
 In August 2022, Roofstock acquired RentPrep, a tenant screening company.

Awards and accolades 

 2017: Named #42 in Best Small Workplaces.
 2018: Named #37 in Best Workplaces.
 2019: Won the HousingWire Tech100.
 2019: Named to the Forbes Fintech 50 List.
 2019: Received the first ever Finovate Awards award for Best Alternative Investments Platform.
 2019: Named #32 in Best Workplaces in the Bay Area (Small and Medium).
 2021: Named to the Forbes Fintech 50 List.
 2022: Named #21 in Best Workplaces in the Bay Area (Small and Medium).
 2022: Named to the Forbes Fintech 50 List.
 2022: Named #90 in Best Workplaces for Millennials (Small and Medium).
 2022: Named #667 on the Inc. 5000 list.
 2022: Named #45 in Best Workplaces in Technology (Small and Medium).
 2022: Named #6 in Best Workplaces for Women (Small and Medium).
 2022: Named to CB Insights' Fintech 250 list.
 2022: Announced first non-fungible token (NFT) home sale.
 2023: Won the HousingWire Tech100.

Funding 

 2016: Received Series A funding of $13.3 Million from Khosla Ventures, Ron Conway, Marc Benioff, Bain Capital and others.
 2016: Received Series B funding of $20 Million.
 2017: Received Series C funding of $50 Million led by Canvas Ventures.
 2020: Received Series D funding of $50 Million led by SVB Capital.
 2020: Received Series D funding of $50 Million led by SVB Capital.
 2022: Received Series E funding of $240 Million led by SoftBank Vision Fund 2.91

References 

Companies based in Oakland, California
Financial technology companies